Grand Prix Gazipaşa is the name of two cycling races:
Grand Prix Gazipaşa (men's race)
Grand Prix Gazipaşa (women's race)